Children's Foundation Research Institute is a partnership between the Children's Foundation of Memphis, the University of Tennessee Health Science Center, and Le Bonheur Children's Hospital. This non-profit clinical and research organization was created in 1995 to provide infrastructure, expertise, support and coordination to facilitate basic, clinical and translational research to improve the health of children.

References

External links
 Le Bonheur Children's Medical Center website
 Children's Foundation Research Center website

University of Tennessee
Non-profit organizations based in Tennessee
Organizations based in Memphis, Tennessee
Organizations established in 1995